Modise is an African name that may refer to
Given name
Modise Mokwadi Fly (died 2010), Botswana politician and activist

Surname
Billy Modise (1940–2016), south African politician 
Clive Moyo-Modise (born 1984), British footballer
Frederick Samuel Modise (1914–1998), South African church leader 
Glayton Modise (1940–2016), leader of the International Pentecostal Holiness Church
Joe Modise (1929–2001), South African political figure 
Karabo Modise (born 1988), Botswana cricketer
Portia Modise (born 1983), South African footballer 
Teko Modise (born 1982), South African football midfielder 
Thandi Modise (born 1959), South African politician 
Tim Modise, South African journalist, broadcaster, public speaker and philanthropist 

Surnames of Botswana
Given names of Botswana